Stefano Coppa was an Italian engraver, active in Rome c. 1776. In conjunction with Giuseppe Perini and Francesco Pozzi, he executed the plates from the antique statues in the Clementine Gallery of the Vatican. He also engraved a print of the Ascension after Giovanni Lanfranco.

References

18th-century Italian people
Italian engravers
Artists from Rome